Kolich Point is a rock point located midway between Spike Cape and Gneiss Point on the east coast of Victoria Land, Antarctica. It was named by the Advisory Committee on Antarctic Names for geophysicist Thomas M. Kolich, who participated in the United States Antarctic Research Program geophysical survey of the Ross Ice Shelf in the 1973–74 and 1974–75 seasons.

References

Headlands of Antarctica
Scott Coast